2014–15 WBFAL was the third edition of Women Basketball Friendship Adriatic League. Participated five teams from three countries, champion became the team of Ragusa Dubrovnik.

Team information

Regular season

Final

External links
Season 2014-15 at eurobasket.com

2014–15
2014–15 in European women's basketball leagues
2014–15 in Bosnia and Herzegovina basketball
2014–15 in Croatian basketball
2014–15 in Montenegrin basketball